Guna de Madungandí or Madungandí, formerly known as Kuna de Madugandí is a comarca indígena (indigenous territory) and corregimiento in Chepo District, Panamá Province, Panama with a population of 4,271 as of 2010. It was created by Law 24 of January 12, 1996. Its population as of 2000 was 3,305.

The primary ethnicity is Guna.

The comarca is not divided into districts; but is divided into 12 communities: Akua Yala, Ibedí, Pintupu, Icandí, Piria, Cuinupdi, Nargandí, Ogobnawila, Diwar Sikua, Capandi and Tabardi. Its capital is Akua Yala.

Its area is 2318.8 km2 and is located near the Bayano River.

References

Corregimientos of Panamá Province
 
Comarcas of Panama
States and territories established in 1996
1996 establishments in Panama